Curarea is a genus of flowering plants in the family Menispermaceae, found in tropical parts of Central and South America. They are dioecious lianas, with at least some species producing toxic compounds such as curare.

Species
Currently accepted species include:

Curarea barnebyana R.Ortiz
Curarea candicans (Rich. ex DC.) Barneby & Krukoff
Curarea crassa Barneby
Curarea cuatrecasasii Barneby & Krukoff
Curarea gentryana R.Ortiz
Curarea iquitana (Diels) R.Ortiz
Curarea tecunarum Barneby & Krukoff
Curarea tomentocarpa (Rusby) R.Ortiz
Curarea toxicofera (Wedd.) Barneby & Krukoff

References

Menispermaceae
Menispermaceae genera